Cole Lake may refer to:

Cole Lake, Ontario, a community in Canada
Cole Lake (Minnesota), a lake in Carlton County
Lake Cole, a lake in Antarctica